Dvořák Ice Rise is an ice rise  in extent, rising above the ice of Mendelssohn Inlet in the southwest part of Alexander Island, Antarctica. It was first mapped, from air photos taken by the Ronne Antarctic Research Expedition, 1947–48, by D. Searle of the Falkland Islands Dependencies Survey in 1960, and was named by the UK Antarctic Place-Names Committee after Antonín Dvořák, the Czech composer. (1841-1904).

See also

 Martin Ice Rise
 Petrie Ice Rises

References 

Ice rises of Antarctica
Bodies of ice of Alexander Island
Ice Rise